The HDI-45 was one of Apple Computer's proprietary cable-to-onboard video connectors. A 45-pin connector, the HDI stands for High-Density Interconnect.

Use
These connectors were used only in the first generation Power Macintosh computers (the Power Macintosh 6100, 7100 and 8100), specifically connecting these computers to the Apple AudioVision 14 Display, the only display to use this connector. Other Apple displays and third-party displays could be used with a special adapter for the receptacle on the computer ("Canneloni", Apple part M2681LL/A or 590-0796-A) or a breakout cable ("Calamari", Apple M1243LL/A or 590-0793-A) for the permanently attached cable to the monitor that converts this unusual port to a standard DA-15 connector.

Technical
In addition to carrying analog RGB video, the connector supports analog stereo audio signals (input and output), Apple Desktop Bus (ADB), and S-video input. Because the AudioVision 14 Display has front-mounted connectors for ADB and audio and video, a single consolidated cable and proprietary connector was used to simplify the connection to the computer and reduce cable clutter.

See also 
 VESA Enhanced Video Connector, a similar concept to consolidate multiple cables

References

External links 
 "HDI-45 Pinout"

Analog video connectors
Electrical signal connectors